E 471 is a European B class road in Ukraine, connecting the cities Mukachevo and Lviv.

Route and E-road junctions

  (on shared signage )
 Mukachevo:  E50 
 Lviv:  E40, E372

External links 
 UN Economic Commission for Europe: Overall Map of E-road Network (2007)
 International E-road network

International E-road network
European routes in Ukraine